Besselsleigh or Bessels Leigh is an English village and civil parish about  southwest of Oxford. Besselsleigh was part of Berkshire until the 1974 boundary changes transferred it to Oxfordshire.  The village is just off the A420 road between Oxford and Swindon.

Manor

Domesday Book
Besselsleigh is almost certainly the "Lea" or "Leigh" owned by a Saxon named Earmund in the 7th century. At the time of the Domesday Book in 1086 it was recorded (as "Leie") as having been held before the Norman Conquest by Northmann of Mereworth of Abingdon Abbey and to have passed under the same overall ownership to the minor feudal lord William the Chamberlain.

Bessels
The manor of Leigh was acquired by the family of Bessels (or Besils, Bessiles, etc.) in the mid-14th century, possibly by Thomas Bessels, and by the next century had become known as "Bessels Leigh" to distinguish it from the many other places in England called "Leigh". According to the antiquary John Leland, the Bessels family had been settled at Besil's Leigh in Berkshire since the reign of Edward I, but originated in Provence in France and were "men of activitye in feates of arms as it appearith in monuments at Legh; how he faught in listes with a straunge knyghte that challengyd hym, at the whitche deade the kynge and quene at that time of England were present."

Fettiplace

Richard Fettiplace (c.1456–1511) married Elizabeth Besil, the only daughter and heiress of William Besil of Besil's-Leigh, which he made his chief seat. Richard  was buried in the chancel of Poughley Priory Church, near Great Shefford in Berkshire, and bequeathed  property to that church and a 99-year lease lands to a chantry chapel within the parish church of East Shifford "to keep an obiit there for my soul and to yearly keep in order the said parish church and to maintain lights there."  In January 1527, Edward Fettiplace, Treasurer to the Charles Brandon, 1st Duke of Suffolk, wrote to Thomas Cromwell, upbraiding him with breaking his word as to granting him the site of the dissolved Poughley Priory, on the faith of which he had given Cromwell 40 shillings at the time of its dissolution, but the lease had been granted to another man. Fettiplace complains that he had bought of Cromwell certain implements belonging to the Priory, of which he left there the well bucket and rope, and a brass pan set in the wall to brew with, which said implements the scholars of the Cardinal's College "have perused and worn in the time of their lying there," but the bursar refuses to pay for them. 

In February 1529, Edward Fettiplace wrote again to Cromwell desiring his interest that he might be assured of more years in the farm of Poughley. From this letter it is evident that Cromwell had been recently visiting the dismantled priory, as Fettiplace records a visit to Poughley, on "the Thursday after our departing," of one John Edden who came with a cart to carry off such stuff as was appointed to go to Wolsey's College at Oxford; the bedding was in Fettiplace's chamber, which was locked, but Edden "with great oaths and with levers brak up the doors."  The great-grandson of Richard Fettiplace (d.1511) and Elizabeth Besil was Besil Fettiplace, Sheriff of Berkshire in 1583. John Fettiplace of Childrey was created a baronet in 1661. John Fettiplace (1527–1580) of Besselsleigh served as a Member of Parliament for Berkshire in 1558 and twice served as Sheriff of Berkshire, in 1568 and 1577. He was buried in Appleton Church in Oxfordshire, where survives his fine mural monument with recumbent effigy.

Lenthall

The estate of Besils Leigh was sold, early in the 17th century, by the Fettiplace family to William Lenthall (1591–1662), Speaker of the House of Commons. "The old manor house, surrounding a quadrangular court, and containing a place of concealment, access to which was obtained in a most difficult and unusual manner, was a magnificent structure where it is said, Cromwell and other leading men of his day were frequently entertained". The house is now demolished.

Parish church

The Church of England parish church of Saint Lawrence existed by the 12th century, and the west wall, Norman south door and possibly some other parts survive from this time. The church was rebuilt in the latter part of the 13th century, which is the date of the Decorated Gothic west window of the nave and east window of the chancel. Most of the other windows are Perpendicular Gothic: that in the north wall of the chancel from the 14th century and others in the church from the 15th century.  In 1632 William Lenthall paid for St Lawrence's to be "beautified and repaired" and in 1788 William John Lenthall paid for further works on the church. The font is 17th-century and the pulpit is 18th-century. St Lawrence's is a Grade II* listed building.  Since 2015 the church has not been in regular use, and is not normally open for visitors.

World War II air crash

On 14 March 1944 an Armstrong Whitworth Whitley V bomber aircraft, T4337 from No. 10 Operational Training Unit RAF at Abingdon, was on circuits and landings practice when its Royal Canadian Air Force pilot lost control while changing from flare path to instruments. The aircraft crashed onto what was then a military firing range at Great Park Farm, Besselsleigh, and almost immediately burst into flames. All three members of its crew were killed.  

At the time United States Army soldiers were billeted at Besselsleigh Park. They and a local man, Ron Amey, tried without success to rescue the crew. The pilot, Sgt DC Adamson, is buried in the Commonwealth War Graves Commission section of Botley Cemetery, on the outskirts of Oxford. Ron Amey went on to succeed his father William Amey as head of the Amey quarrying and construction company.

Economy and amenities

Besselsleigh has a public house, the Greyhound. The Greyhound is in the coat of arms of the Lenthall family who used to own Besselsleigh Hall.  Parklands Campus (formerly Bessels Leigh School and Spires School) at the edge of the village is an independent special school for boys and girls aged 11 to 16, run by the charity Action for Children.

See also
Marcham, where an RAF Armstrong Whitworth Whitley aircraft crashed on a training flight in 1942

References

Sources

Civil parishes in Oxfordshire
Villages in Oxfordshire